Gbenga Omotoso (born November 11, 1961) is a journalist, writer and columnist. He was the editor at The Nation newspaper until he was appointed as the Commissioner in charge of the Lagos State Ministry of Information and Strategy. He was sworn in 2019 by the Lagos State Governor, Babajide Sanwo-Olu.

Early life 
Omotoso was born on November 11, 1961. He is from Osun State, South West, Nigeria. He graduated from the University of Benin in 1984 where he received his B.A. in English and Literature. He proceeded with a Masters in Public and International Affairs at the University of Lagos, Akoka, which he completed in 2007.

Career 
Omotoso has spent 35 years in the media. He started as a trainee sub-editor at The Guardian newspaper. He later became the deputy editor of Guardian Express from where he rose to become the Editor of the Saturday Guardian. In 1999, at the inception of the Comet newspaper, he was appointed the pioneer editor of the newspaper.

In 2006 he again became the pioneer editor of The Nation newspaper. He has maintained a column "Editorial Notebook" in The Nation, where he writes on topical issues using humor to present serious issues. He is a member of Nigeria Guild of Editors (NGE) and member of Nigeria Union of Journalists (NUJ).

He is a great lover of sports, particularly table tennis. He has had to show his skills in an exhibition against the world's 20th best table tennis player, Aruna Quadri, and he reportedly did not play like an amateur.

Awards 
Omotoso has received many awards for excellence in media practice. The awards include the DAME Award in 2010, Nigeria Media Merit Award Editor of the Year in 2013, Nigeria Media Merit Award Editor of the Year in 2015, and Nigeria Media Merit Award Editor of the Year in 2017.

References 

1961 births
Living people
Nigerian journalists
Nigerian male writers
People from Osun State
University of Benin (Nigeria) alumni
University of Lagos alumni